Gekko petricolus, also known as the sandstone gecko or the Thai gecko, is a species of gecko. It is found in Thailand, Laos, and northern Cambodia.

References

Gekko
Reptiles of Cambodia
Reptiles of Laos
Reptiles of Vietnam
Reptiles described in 1962
Taxa named by Edward Harrison Taylor